Diplommatina cacuminulus is a species of land snails with an operculum, terrestrial gastropod mollusks in the family Diplommatinidae.

Distribution
This species is endemic to Malaysia.  Its natural habitat is subtropical or tropical moist lowland forests. It is threatened by habitat loss.

References

 Vermeulen, J.J. (1993). Notes on the non-marine molluscs of the island of Borneo 5. The genus Diplommatina (Gastropoda Prosobranchia Diplommatinidae). Basteria. 57: 3-69. Leide

Endemic fauna of Malaysia
Invertebrates of Malaysia
Diplommatina
Gastropods described in 1993
Taxonomy articles created by Polbot